Hobo Gadget Band is a 1939 Warner Bros. Merrie Melodies cartoon directed by Ben Hardaway and Cal Dalton The short was released on June 17, 1939. The voices in this cartoon were provided by Mel Blanc, Pinto Colvig and the Paul Taylor group.

Plot
The cartoon focuses on a band of homeless men who reside in a hotel.

References

Merrie Melodies short films
Warner Bros. Cartoons animated short films